Balthazar, or variant spellings, may refer to:

Arts, entertainment and media

 Balthazar (novel), by Lawrence Durrell, 1958
 Balthasar, an 1889 book by Anatole France
 Professor Balthazar, a Croatian animated TV series, 1967–1978
 Balthazar (TV series), a 2018 French crime thriller drama
 Balthazar (band), a Belgian indie pop and rock group
 DJ Balthazar, a Bulgarian group
 Au Hasard Balthazar, a 1966 French tragic film

People

Footballers
 Baltasar (footballer) (born 1966), Portuguese footballer
 Baltasar Gonçalves (born 1948), or Baltasar, Portuguese footballer
 Baltazar (footballer, born 1926), Oswaldo da Silva, Brazilian football striker
 Baltazar (footballer, born 1959), Baltazar Maria de Morais Júnior, Brazilian football striker
 Marco Balthazar (born 1983), Brazilian footballer
 Batata (footballer) (Baltazar Costa Rodrigues de Oliveira, born 2000), Brazilian footballer

Other people with the given name
 Balthazar (given name), including a list of people with the name
 Balthazar (magus), a name commonly attributed to one of Three Wise Men
 Balthasar of Werle ( 1375–1421), Lord of Werle-Güstrow
 Balthasar, Duke of Mecklenburg (1451–1507)
 Balthasar of Żagań (c. 1415 – 1472), a Duke of Żagań-Przewóz

People with the surname
 Bogdan Baltazar (1939–2012), Romanian banker and politician
 Hans Urs von Balthasar (1905–1988), Swiss theologian and priest
 J. G. Balthazar, Sri Lankan Burgher army brigadier
 Marco Balthazar (born 1983), Brazilian footballer
 Nic Balthazar (born 1964), Belgian film director
 Wilhelm Balthasar (1914–1941), World War II German Luftwaffe ace
 Francisco Balagtas (1788–1862), or Francisco Baltazar, Filipino poet

Places 
 Balthazar River (Dominica)
 Balthazar River (Grenada)

Other uses 
 Balthazar (restaurant), in New York City, U.S.
 Balthazar Science Center, Skövde, Sweden
 Balthazar, a 12-litre wine bottle

See also 
 
 
 
 
 Belshazzar (disambiguation)

Surnames from given names